Ephraim Curzon (first ¼ 1883 – death unknown) was an English soldier, and rugby union and professional rugby league footballer who played in the 1900s and 1910s. He played representative level rugby union (RU) for British Army Rugby Union, and at club level for Carlisle RFC, Lismore RFC (in Edinburgh), and Kirkcaldy RFC (in Fife), and representative level rugby league (RL) for Great Britain and Lancashire, and at club level for Salford, as a forward (prior to the specialist positions of), during the era of contested scrums.

Background
Ephraim Curzon's birth was registered in Crumpsall, Prestwich district, he served as a British soldier in South Africa during the Second Boer War.

Playing career

International honours
Ephraim Curzon was selected to play during the 1910 Great Britain Lions tour of Australia and New Zealand (RL) while at Salford, he won caps against Australia, and Australasia.

Representative honours
Ephraim Curzon represented the British Army Rugby Union (RU) scoring both tries against South Africa.

Club career
Ephraim Curzon's last match for Salford took place against Hull Kingston Rovers in April 1911, though Salford retained Curzon's playing registration until 1915.

References

External links
!Great Britain Statistics at englandrl.co.uk (statistics currently missing due to not having appeared for both Great Britain, and England)

1883 births
British Army personnel of the Second Boer War
English rugby league players
English rugby union players
Great Britain national rugby league team players
Lancashire rugby league team players
People from Crumpsall
Place of death missing
Rugby league forwards
Rugby league players from Manchester
Rugby union players from Manchester
Salford Red Devils players
Year of death missing